Palazzo Taverna may refer to:

 Palazzo Taverna, Milan, Italy
 Palazzo Taverna, Rome, Italy